Ottmar von Holtz (born 27 July 1961) is a German politician of Alliance 90/The Greens who served as a member of the Bundestag from the state of Lower Saxony from 2017 to 2021.

Early life and career 
Von Holtz was born in Gobabis.
 
From 1982 to 1983, von Holtz studied economics (B.Comm) at the University of Stellenbosch in South Africa and until 1988, graduating with a degree in economics at the University of Hannover. In 1988, he was a lecturer in statistics and econometrics at the University of Namibia, then – after his return to Hannover – he was a lecturer and head of department at the Lower Saxony State Statistical Office until 2005.

Political career 
Von Holtz became a member of the Bundestag in the 2017 German federal election. In parliament, he served on the Committee on Economic Cooperation and Development, the Subcommittee on Civilian Crisis Prevention and the Subcommittee on Global Health.

Other activities 
 German Foundation for World Population (DSW), Member of the Parliamentary Advisory Board (2018–2021)
 German United Services Trade Union (ver.di), Member

References

External links 

  
 Bundestag biography 
 

 

1961 births
Living people
Members of the Bundestag for Lower Saxony
Members of the Bundestag 2017–2021
Members of the Bundestag for Alliance 90/The Greens